Karnin  is a village in the administrative district of Gmina Deszczno, within Gorzów County, Lubusz Voivodeship, in western Poland.

The village has a population of 280.

References

Karnin